Cheri or Chéri may refer to:

People

Given name 
 Cheri Blauwet (born 1980), American wheelchair racer
 Cheri Dennis (born 1979), American singer
 Cheri DiNovo (born 1950), Canadian United Church minister and social democratic politician
 Cheri Elliott (born 1970), old school American champion female bicycle motocross racer
 Cheri Gaulke (born 1954), contemporary artist
 Cheri Huber (born c. 1944), independent American Zen teacher
 Cheri Keaggy (born 1968), gospel singer and songwriter
 Cheri Maracle (born 1972), Indigenous Canadian actor and musician
 Cheri Oteri (born 1962), American actress and comedian
 Cheri Register (born 1945), American author and teacher
 Cheri Yecke, American politician
 Cheri Jo Bates (1948–1966), American murder victim of the Zodiac Killer

Surname 
 Fernand J. Cheri III (born 1952), American Catholic bishop

Places
 Cheri, Iran, a village in North Khorasan Province, Iran
 Cheri, Niger, a town in Niger
 Cheri Monastery, Bhutan

Other uses
 Chéri (band), a Canadian female dance music duo
 Chéri (novel), a 1920 novel by French author Colette
 Chéri (film), a 2009 film based on the novel
 Chéri+, a Japanese magazine
 Cheri Magazine an american pornographic magazine published since 1976. 
 Chéri, an older French-language term for sharia law used during the time of the Ottoman Empire, from the Turkish şer’(i)

See also
 Chari (disambiguation)
 Cherie (disambiguation)
 Cherri (disambiguation)
 Cherrie, a surname or given name
 Cherry (disambiguation)
 Chieri (disambiguation)
 Shari (disambiguation)
 Sheri (disambiguation)
 Sherie, a given name
 Sherri (name)
 Sherrie, a given name
 Sherry (disambiguation)
 Shery (born 1985), Guatemalan Latin pop singer and songwriter